The al-Khisas massacre took place in al-Khisas in Mandatory Palestine on December 18, 1947, near the Syrian border and was carried out by Haganah militiamen, possibly from Palmach. 

The raid was performed in reprisal to a shooting in which a passenger on a horse-cart from a nearby kibbutz was shot and killed earlier that day, in an unrelated personal vendetta. Local Palmach commanders mistakenly assumed the shooting was political, and mistakenly judged that it had emanated from al-Khisas. 

The rationale at that time for the raid was that "if there was no reaction to the murder, the Arabs would interpret this as a sign of weakness and an invitation to further attacks". The Hagana High Command approved an attack on men only and the burning of a few houses. Twelve Arab residents of Al-Khisas were killed, four of them children. The Jewish leadership at the time sharply criticized the attack. Three weeks later, Arab forces crossed the Syrian border and carried out a reprisal attack on the kibbutz Kfar Szold, but suffered heavy losses and were repulsed. 

The events led to an escalation in violence that rapidly spread through the Upper Galilee region; the region had generally been quiet before the massacre, which was blamed for unnecessarily widening the hostilities.

Incident
According to Haim Levenberg:
One unit attacked with hand-grenades a four-roomed house killing two men and five children, and wounding five other men. At the same time, another unit attacked a house in the village owned by Amir Al-Fa’ur of Syria, in which one Syrian and two Lebanese peasants were killed and another Lebanese and two local men were wounded. According to HQ British Troops in Palestine, the villagers did not use any firearms to defend themselves.

The massacre was carried out by the Palmach's Yiftach Brigade 3rd Battalion. During the operation a female member of the battalion refused to throw a grenade into a room in which she could hear a child crying; following the event the battalion's commander Moshe Kelman argued that women should not be used on front line duties but should be used as "cooks and service people."

See also
Killings and massacres during the 1948 Palestine war

References

Massacres in Mandatory Palestine
Mass murder in 1947
Massacres of men
Violence against men in Asia